Sailing at the 2010 South American Games in Medellín was held from 23–25 March. All games were played at Embalse de Guatapé.

Medal summary

Medal table

Events

References

2010 South American Games
South American Games
2010
Sailing competitions in Colombia